Black Mountain is a summit in the Cleveland National Forest of the Peninsular Ranges in eastern San Diego County, California, north of Ramona. Black Mountain offers a WX channel for people who wish to tune in on radios to hear the weather; channel is located on VHF frequency 162.4000 MHz.

Black Mountain is home to one of the largest remaining tracts of the threatened Engelmann Oak (Quercus engelmannii).

References

External links 
 

Mountains of San Diego County, California
Mountains of Southern California